The Javanese Farmers Museum (Indonesian Museum Tani Jawa Indonesia) is a small museum located in the tourist village of Candran, in Kebon Agung, Bantul Regency, Yogyakarta. The museum is instrumental in the region.

Museum
The idea to establish a museum dedicated to the Javanese farming was started in 1998. At that time, traditional farming implements were collected to be preserved. The collection was done by the villagers in Candran village led by the chief of the village. On May 27, 2007, the museum was established; exactly one year following the major earthquake in Yogyakarta. The museum was built on a plot of land which belongs to Ki Condro, the founder of Candran Village. Funding for the construction of the museum was collected by the Regent of Bantul from villagers surrounding the area. 

The goal of the museum is to enable visitors to learn about Javanese culture of farming and its arts, and to enable visitors to experience Javanese farmings by using the items. Javanese Farm Museum has been incorporated into the Supervisory Board of the Museums (BARASMUS, Badan Musyawarah Museum), an organization which oversees museums in Indonesia. The Javanese Farm Museum is supervised by the Indonesian Department of Tourism, Education, and Culture.

Collection
The Javanese Farmers Museum houses collection of traditional implements used by the farmers of Java, usually of rice farming. There are also a collection of objects related to the agriculture of fruit trees, the production of food, and traditional forms of transportation. Today, 260 farming-related implements are housed in the Javanese Farmers Museum. The average age of the artifacts in the museum is 50 years old. 

Activities
The Javanese Farmers Museum routinely hold activities for visitors. Rice planting competition and traditional cooking competition are held in January and March each. In the month of May, a festival featuring traditional performing arts e.g. gamelan performance or percussive performance using long mortar (alu) is held. In July is the National memedi sawah (traditional scarecrows) festival. In the month November, an expo to showcase Javanese farming produces is held.

See also
List of museums and cultural institutions in Indonesia

References

Cited works 

Museums in Yogyakarta
Javanese culture